is a city located in Ōita Prefecture, Kyushu, Japan. As of March 31, 2017, the city has an estimated population of 23,059, with 10,595 households and a population density of 110 persons per km². The total area is 206.65 km². 

On March 31, 2005, the towns of Kakaji and Matama (both from Nishikunisaki District) were merged into Bungotakada.

Geography

Climate
Bungotakada has a humid subtropical climate (Köppen climate classification Cfa) with hot summers and cool winters. Precipitation is significant throughout the year, but is somewhat lower in winter.

Demographics
Per Japanese census data, the population of Bungotakada in 2020 is 22,112 people. Bungotakada has been conducting censuses since 1950.

Agriculture
Bungotakada is known for negi (Welsh onions).

Points of interest
Historic sites include Fuki-ji, Maki Ōdō, and Kumano magaibutsu.

Shōwa Town (Shōwa no Machi in Japanese) is also a sightseeing spot.

References

External links

 

Cities in Ōita Prefecture